Conversations With Myself may refer to:

 Conversations with Myself (album), a 1963 jazz album by Bill Evans
 Conversations With Myself (book), a 2010 book by Nelson Mandela